Once Around the Sun may refer to:
 Once Around the Sun (Joby Talbot album), 2005
 Once Around the Sun (Shane Richie album), 2000